The Bundesstraße 46 was a former German federal highway.

It led from Offenbach am Main, where it branched off from the Bundesstraße 43, in a southerly direction to Sprendlingen, where it connected to the Bundesstraße 3. The  road was constructed in the 1820s by the Grand Duchy of Hesse to avoid the territory of the Free City of Frankfurt. Due to the Bundesautobahn 661 running directly parallel, the road was downgraded to a Landesstraße (L3313) starting in 2010.

See also
List of federal highways in Germany

References

Bundesstraße
Roads in Hesse